Marielitos is the name given to the Cuban immigrants that  left Cuba from the Port of Mariel in 1980. Approximately 135,000 people left the country to  the United States from April to September  in what became known as the Mariel boatlift.

History

While there already was, largely successful, Cuban emigration to the United States before the 1980s, the third and most well-known wave of Cuban emigration was in 1980. The Cuban government permitted approximately 125,000 Cubans to board a decrepit fleet of boats in Mariel Harbor; of the 125,000 refugees that entered the United States on the boatlift, around 16,000 to 20,000 were estimated to be criminals or "undesirables" according to a 1985 Sun Sentinel magazine article. In a 1985 report around 350 to 400 Mariel Cubans were reported to inhabit Dade County jails on a typical day. However, Demetrio Perez, the city commissioner of Miami, had said "...That even among those Marielitos who had criminal records, there were thousands whose offenses were so minor that they would not be considered criminals here, and thousands of others whose ‘criminal record’ was based on their opposition to the Communist regime." Estimates assert that the Cuban refugees only included some 2,700 hardened criminals.

The U.S. government claimed they were ready to accept Marielito refugees with open-arms on May 5, 1980; however, this was short-lived after President Carter accused Castro of sending mostly criminals to the United States June 7 of the same year. Castro denied President Carter’s accusation only one week later, yet he agreed to accept 3,000 Marielitos back into Cuba. Remarkably, this was the only time Castro agreed to allow criminals back to the island for the next 30+ years.

Restrictions on these new American citizens tighten and loosen with the subsequent presidential administrations. President Clinton loosened restrictions to allow flights between Havana and Miami. President Bush tightened travel restrictions to allow a singular visit once every three years for the Marielitos. 

In 2013 Raul Castro, brother of Fidel Castro, took power over Cuba. When President Obama took office in 2009, he made an effort to loosen travel restrictions once again. He allowed unlimited trips for Marielitos to visit their families in an attempt to normalize relations with Cuba. In a similar fashion, President Obama also declared there will be a U.S. Embassy in Havana, Cuba.

In 2019 Raul Castro stepped down and Miguel Diaz-Canel became his successor. The Trump administration imposed historically heavy sanctions on Cuba. These sanctions were the most extreme Cuba has seen since Kennedy in the early 1960’s. Conversely, President Biden expressed desires in his campaign to ease these sanctions from the Trump administration; however, President Biden has not taken any action yet.

The history of the Mariel boatlift and the legacy of the Marielitos leave across the United States today continues to leave a lasting impact on policy decisions today.

Membership

Marielito crime gangs consist of generally male Cubans. Many of the original Marielitos have specific tattoos, displaying patron saints, names, words or arcane symbols. Marielito gang members, White Cubans as well as Afro-Cubans, are members of Afro Cuban religious cults engaged in religious rituals often resulting in self-inflicted bodily scars.
While the original Marielito gang members came to the US in the 1980s, younger Cuban-Americans living in impoverished neighborhoods may imitate the rituals of the original Marielito criminals.

Activities

Marielito crime groups are mostly involved in drug trafficking and contract killing, although prostitution, corruption, extortion, robbery, burglary, auto theft and money laundering are also activities of choice. In some cases they have aligned themselves with American Mafia families and Colombian cartels to set up drug pipelines and working for them as enforcers.
Marielito gang activity isn't as endemic as it was in the 80's, but Marielito gangs are still active in Los Angeles, Washington and New York City (especially the South Bronx).

References

Street gangs
Hispanic-American gangs
Latino street gangs
Cuban-American culture
Organized crime groups in the United States